The following is a list of radio stations currently owned by iHeartMedia. Of these stations, 448 of the stations which are outside the Top 100 DMA markets, plus another 91 stations which may or may not be in the top 100 DMAs are for sale. The TV stations formerly owned by Clear Channel were sold to Providence Equity Partners, a private equity firm, on April 23, 2007, with the deal closing in late November 2007. 185 radio stations were to have been sold to GoodRadio.TV LLC until the sale fell apart over financing., and another 177 stations have been sold to other entities. Another 201 stations are up for sale.

All stations are identified as “An iHeartRadio Station” during station identifications.

Radio stations

Alabama

Auburn
WCJM-FM 100.9 - Country
WKKR 97.7 - Country
WMXA 96.7 - Hot AC
WPCH 1310 - Sports
WTLM 1520 - Gospel
WZMG 910 - Sports

Birmingham
WDXB 102.5 - Country
WDXB HD-2 92.7 - (Black Information Network)
WERC 960 - News/Talk (Simulcasts most of the programming of WERC-FM)
WERC-FM 105.5 - News/Talk
WERC-FM HD-2 105.1 - Urban Gospel
WERC-FM HD-3 106.5 - Urban AC
WMJJ 96.5 - Adult Contemporary
WMJJ HD-2 104.1 - Urban Contemporary
WQEN 103.7 - Top 40
WQEN HD-2 103.1 - Active Rock
WQEN HD-3 103.7 - Alternative

Gadsden
WAAX 570/101.9 - News/Talk
WGMZ 93.1 - Classic Hits

Huntsville
WBHP 1230/102.5 - News/Talk
WDRM 102.1 - Country
WHOS 800 - News/Talk (Simulcast of WBHP)
WQRV 100.3 - Classic Hits
WQRV HD-2 106.5 - Top 40
WQRV HD-3 100.3 - Alternative
WTAK-FM 106.1 - Classic Rock

Mobile
WKSJ-FM 94.9 - Country
WMXC 99.9 - Adult Contemporary
WMXC HD-2 100.3 - Gospel
WNTM 710 - Talk
WRGV 107.3 - Hip Hop
WRKH 96.1 - Classic Rock
WRKH HD-2 99.5 - Sports
WTKX-FM 101.5 - Active Rock

Montgomery
WHLW 104.3 - Urban Gospel
WWMG 97.1 - Urban AC
WZHT 105.7 - Hip Hop

Tuscaloosa
WACT 1420/96.9 - Adult Contemporary
WRTR 105.9 - News/Talk
WTXT 98.1 - Country
WZBQ 94.1 - Top 40

Alaska

Anchorage
KASH-FM 107.5 - Country
KBFX 100.5 - Classic Rock
KENI 650 - News/Talk
KGOT 101.3 - Top 40
KTZN 550 - Sports
KYMG 98.9 - Adult Contemporary

Fairbanks
KAKQ-FM 101.1 - Adult Contemporary
KFBX 970 - News/Talk
KIAK-FM 102.5 - Country
KKED 104.7 - Alternative

Arizona

Phoenix
KESZ 99.9 - Adult Contemporary
KFYI 550 - News/Talk
KGME 910 - Sports
KMXP 96.9 - Hot AC
KNIX-FM 102.5 - Country
KOY 1230/93.7 - Regional Mexican
KYOT 95.5 - Adult Hits
KZZP 104.7 - Top 40

Tucson
KHUD 92.9 - Country
KMMA 97.1 - Spanish Top 40
KNST 790 - News/Talk
KOHT 98.3 - Hip Hop
KRQQ 93.7 - Top 40
KTZR 1450 - Sports
KXEW 1600 - Tejano

Arkansas

Fayetteville
KEZA 107.9 - Adult Contemporary
KIGL 93.3 - Classic Rock
KKIX 103.9 - Country
KMXF 101.9/102.3 - Top 40

Fort Smith
KKBD 95.9 - Classic Rock
KMAG 99.1 - Country
KWHN 1320 - News/Talk
KZBB 97.9 - Hot Adult Contemporary

Little Rock
KDJE 100.3 - Active Rock
KHKN 94.9 - Rhythmic Top 40
KMJX 105.1 - Classic Country
KSSN 95.7 - Country

California

Bakersfield
KBFP 800 - Sports
KBFP-FM 105.3 - Adult Contemporary
KDFO 98.5 - Classic Rock
KHTY 970 - Sports
KRAB 106.1 - Alternative Rock

Fresno
KALZ 96.7 - Talk
KBOS-FM 94.9 - Rhythmic Contemporary
KCBL 1340 - Sports
KFBT 103.7 - Rhythmic AC
KFSO-FM 92.9 - Regional Mexican
KHGE 102.7 - Country
KRDU 1130 - Christian Talk
KRZR 1400 - Talk (Simulcast of KALZ)
KSOF 98.9 - Soft Adult Contemporary

Los Angeles
KBIG 104.3 - Hot AC
KEIB 1150 - Talk
KFI 640 - News/Talk
KIIS-FM 102.7 - Top 40
KLAC 570 - Sports
KOST 103.5/94.7/103.9 - Mainstream AC
KRRL 92.3 - Hip Hop
KSRY 103.1 - Alternative (Simulcast of KYSR)
KVVS 105.5 - Top 40 (Simulcast of KIIS-FM)
KYSR 98.7 - Alternative

Modesto
KFIV 1360 - News/Talk
KJSN 102.3 - Adult Contemporary
KMRQ 96.7 - Active Rock
KOSO 92.9 - Country
KWSX 1280/103.7 - Sports

Monterey
KDON-FM 102.5 - Rhythmic Contemporary 
KION 1460/101.1 - News/Talk
KOCN 105.1 - Rhythmic AC
KPRC-FM 100.7/100.9 - Spanish
KTOM-FM 92.7 - Country

Riverside
KFOO 1440 - African-American oriented all-news (Black Information Network)
KGGI 99.1 - Top 40 (Rhythmic)
KMYT 94.5 - Alternative rock
KPWK 1350 - Sports
KTMQ 103.3 - Active Rock

Sacramento
KBEB 92.5 - Soft AC
KFBK 1530 - News/Talk
KFBK-FM 93.1 - News/Talk Simulcast of KFBK (AM)
KHYL 101.1 - Rhythmic AC
KSTE 650 - Talk
KYRV 93.7 - Classic Rock
KYRV HD-2 107.1 - Country
KZIS 107.9 - Hot AC

San Diego
KGB 760 - Sports
KGB-FM 101.5 - Classic Rock
KHTS-FM 93.3 - Top 40
KIOZ 105.3 - Rock
KLSD 1360/103.3 - Talk
KMYI 94.1 - Hot AC
KOGO 600/106.3 - News/Talk
KSSX 95.7 - Urban Contemporary

San Francisco
KIOI 101.3 - Hot Adult Contemporary 
KISQ 98.1 - Adult Contemporary 
KKSF 910 - African-American oriented all-news (Black Information Network)
KMEL 106.1 - Urban Contemporary 
KNEW 960 - Business Talk (operated by Bloomberg)
KOSF 103.7 - 80's Music
KYLD 94.9 - Top 40

Stockton
KQOD 100.1 - Rhythmic AC

Colorado

Colorado Springs
KBPL 107.9 - Mainstream Rock
KCCY-FM 96.9 - Country
KIBT 96.1 - Hip Hop
KKLI 106.3 - Adult Contemporary
KVUU 99.9 - Hot AC

Denver
KBCO 97.3 - Adult Album Alternative
KBPI 107.9 - Active Rock
KDFD 760/93.7 - Conservative Talk
KDHT 95.7/101.7 - Top 40
KHOW 630 - News/Talk
KOA 850/94.1 - News/Talk
KRFX 103.5 - Classic Rock
KTCL 93.3 - Alternative
KWBL 106.7 - Country

Fort Collins
KCOL 600 - News/Talk
KIIX 1410 - Classic Country
KPAW 92.9 - Classic Rock
KSME 96.1 - Top 40
KSME-HD2 94.9 - Adult Album Alternative
KXBG 97.9 - Country
KXBG HD-2 107.3 - 1990's Hits

Pueblo
KCSJ 590 - News/Talk
KPHT 95.5 - Classic Hits
KUBE 1350 - Sports

Connecticut

Hartford
WHCN 105.9 - Classic Hits
WKSS 95.7 - Top 40
WPOP 1410/100.9 - News/Talk/Sports
WUCS 97.9 - Sports
WWYZ 92.5 - Country

New Haven
WAVZ 1300 - Sports
WELI 960/96.9 - News/Talk
WKCI-FM 101.3 - Top 40
WKCI-FM HD2 100.9 - Hip Hop

Delaware

Wilmington
WDOV 1410 - News/Talk
WDSD 94.7 - Country
WILM 1450 - News/Talk
WRDX 92.9 - Hot AC
WWTX 1290 - Sports

District of Columbia

Washington
WASH-FM 97.1 - Adult Contemporary
WBIG-FM 100.3 - Classic Rock
WIHT 99.5 - Top 40
WIHT-HD2 99.5 - LGBTQ+ (Pride Radio)
WMZQ-FM 98.7 - Country
WUST 1120 AM - African-American oriented all-news (Black Information Network)
WWDC 101.1 - Alternative
WWDC HD-2 104.7 - Talk

Florida

Fort Myers
WBCG 98.9 - Classic Rock
WBTT 105.5 - Hip Hop
WCCF 1580/100.9 - News/Talk
WCKT 107.1 - Country
WCVU 104.9 - Soft Oldies
WIKX 92.9 - Country
WKII 1070 - Sports
WOLZ 95.3 - Classic Hits
WZJZ 100.1 - Hot AC

Jacksonville
WFXJ 930/97.3 - Spanish News/Talk
WJBT 93.3 - Hip Hop
WJBT HD-2 104.1 - African-American oriented all-news (Black Information Network)
WKSL 97.9 - Top 40
WQIK-FM 99.1 - Country
WQIK-FM HD-2 106.9 - Spanish Contemporary
WSOL-FM 101.5 - Urban AC
WWJK 107.3 - Active Rock

Melbourne
WFKS 95.1 - Top 40
WLRQ-FM 99.3 - Adult Contemporary
WMMB 1240/92.7 - News/Talk
WMMV 1350 - News/Talk (Simulcast of WMMB)

Miami
WBGG-FM 105.9 - Classic Rock
WHYI-FM 100.7 - Top 40
WHYI-FM HD-2 93.5 - Dance
WINZ 940 - Sports
WIOD 610 - News/Talk
WMIA-FM 93.9 - Hot AC
WMIA-FM HD-2 104.7 - Country
WMIB 103.5 - Hip Hop
WMIB HD-3 105.5 - Classic Hip Hop
WXBN 880 - African-American oriented all-news (Black Information Network)
WZTU 94.9 - Spanish Top 40

Orlando
WFLF 540/93.1/94.1 - News/Talk
WJRR 101.1 - Active Rock 
WJRR-HD3 101.1 - Alternative Rock
WMGF 107.7 - Adult Contemporary
WMGF-HD2 107.7 - Smooth Jazz
WRSO 810/97.9 - Spanish News/Talk (owned by Star Over Orlando, Inc.)
WRUM 100.3 - Spanish Top 40
WRUM HD-2 97.1 - Bilingual CHR
WTKS-FM 104.1 - Talk/Classic Rock
WTKS-FM HD-2 104.5 - Hip Hop
WXXL 106.7 - Top 40
WXXL-HD2 106.7 - LGBTQ (Pride Radio)
WYGM 740/96.9 - Sports

Panama City
WEBZ 99.3 - Urban adult contemporary 
WFLF-FM 94.5 - Mainstream Rock
WFSY 98.5 - Adult Contemporary
WPAP 92.5 - Country
WPAP HD-2 96.3/102.5 - Conservative Talk

Sarasota
WCTQ 92.1 - Classic Country
WDIZ 1320 - Oldies
WSDV 1450/103.9 - Hot Adult Contemporary
WSRZ-FM 107.9 - Classic Hits
WTZB 105.9 - Classic Rock

Tallahassee
WFLA-FM 100.7 - Talk
WGMY 107.1 - Top 40
WGMY HD-2 105.3 - Urban Contemporary
WGMY HD-3 100.3 - African-American oriented all-news (Black Information Network)
WTLY 1270/96.5 - Sports
WTNT-FM 94.9 - Country
WXSR 101.5 - Mainstream Rock

Tampa Bay
WBTP 95.7/93.7/96.7 - Hip Hop
WDAE 620/95.3 - Sports
WFLA 970/94.5/99.1 - News/Talk
WFLZ-FM 93.3 - Top 40
WFUS 103.5 - Country
WHNZ 1250/105.9 - Spanish News/Talk
WMTX 100.7 - Adult Contemporary
WRUB 106.5 - Spanish
WXTB 97.9 - Active Rock

West Palm Beach
WAVW 92.7 - Country
WBZT 1230 - Sports
WCZR 101.7 - Talk
WJNO 1290 - Talk
WKGR 98.7 - Classic Rock
WLDI 95.5 - Top 40
WOLL 105.5 - Adult Contemporary
WQOL 103.7 - Classic Hits
WRLX 94.3 - Spanish AC
WZTA 1370/107.9 - Oldies
WZZR 92.1 - Talk
WZZR HD-2 93.3 - Classic Hip-Hop

Georgia

Albany
WGEX 97.3 - Top 40
WJIZ-FM 96.3 - Hip Hop
WJYZ 960 - Gospel
WMRZ 98.1 - Urban AC
WOBB 100.3 - Country

Atlanta
WBIN 640 - African-American oriented all-news (Black Information Network)
WBZW 96.7 - Regional Mexican
WBZY 105.7 - Spanish CHR
WRDG 105.3 - Hip Hop
WUBL 94.9 - Country
WUBL-HD2 94.9 - Adult Hits
WWPW 96.1 - Top 40

Augusta
WBBQ-FM 104.3 - Adult Contemporary
WKSP 96.3 - Urban AC
WLUB 105.7 - Country
WLUB HD-2 106.3 - Classic Rock
WPRW-FM 107.7 - Hip Hop
WYNF 1340 - African-American oriented all-news (Black Information Network)

Brunswick
WBGA 1490/96.3 - Gospel
WGIG 1440/98.7 - News/Talk
WHFX 107.7 - Classic Rock
WQGA 103.3 - Hot AC
WYNR 102.5 - Country

Columbus
WAGH 101.3 - Urban AC
WDAK 540 - News/Talk
WGSY 100.1 - Adult Contemporary
WHTY 1460/94.7 - African-American oriented all-news (Black Information Network)
WSTH-FM 106.1/101.7 - Country
WVRK 102.9 - Mainstream Rock

Macon
WGST 720 - News/Talk
WIBB-FM 97.9 - Hip Hop
WIHB 1280/97.3/103.3 - Classic Country
WIHB-FM 96.5 - Country
WMGE 1670 - African-American oriented all-news (Black Information Network)
WMGP 98.1 - Classic Hits
WQBZ 106.3 - Classic Rock
WRBV 101.7 - Urban AC
WRZX 1400 - Sports

Savannah
WAEV 97.3 - Top 40
WLVH 101.1 - Urban AC
WQBT 94.1 - Hip Hop
WSOK 1230/99.7 - Gospel
WTKS 1290/97.7 - News/Talk
WYKZ 98.7 - Adult Contemporary

Hawaii

Honolulu
KDNN 98.5 - Ethnic
KDNN HD-2 99.1 - Ethnic
KHVH 830 - News/Talk
KIKI 990 - Sports
KSSK 590 - Adult Contemporary
KSSK-FM 92.3 - Adult Contemporary
KUBT 93.9 - Top 40 (Rhythmic)
KUBT HD-2 99.1 - Rhythmic AC/Classic Hip Hop
KUCD 101.9 - Alternative
KUCD HD-2 99.1 - Asian CHR

Illinois

Chicago
WCHI-FM 95.5 - Mainstream Rock
WCHI-FM-HD2 95.5 - Country
WCHI-FM-HD3 95.5 - Smooth Jazz
WGCI-FM 107.5 - Hip Hop
WGRB 1390 - Gospel
WKSC-FM 103.5 - Top 40
WLIT-FM 93.9 - Soft Adult Contemporary
WMFN 640 - African-American oriented all-news (Black Information Network) (owned by Birach Broadcasting Corporation)
WVAZ 102.7 - Urban AC

Indiana

Indianapolis
WFBQ 94.7 - Classic Rock
WNDE 1260 Sports
WOLT 103.3 - Classic Alternative
WOLT HD-3 97.5 - Business News
WZRL 98.3 - Hip Hop

Iowa

Cedar Rapids
KKRQ 100.7 - Classic rock
KKSY-FM 96.5 - New country
KMJM 1360/101.5 - Oldies
KOSY-FM 95.7 - Top 40
KXIC 800 - Sports
WMT 600 - News/Talk

Davenport
KCQQ 106.5 - Classic hits
KMXG 96.1 - Adult contemporary
KUUL 101.3 - Top 40
WFXN 1230 - Sports 
WLLR-FM 103.7 - Country
WLLR-FM HD-2 104.5 - Alternative Rock
WOC 1420 - News/Talk

Des Moines
KASI 1430 - News/Talk
KCYZ 105.1 - Hot AC
KDRB 100.3 - Adult hits
KKDM 107.5 - Top 40
KXNO 1460 - Sports
KXNO-FM 106.3 - Sports
KXNO-FM HD-2 96.9 - Country
WHO 1040 - News/Talk

Sioux City
KGLI 95.5 - Adult Contemporary
KMNS 620 - Sports
KSEZ 97.9 - Rock
KSFT-FM 107.1 - Top 40
KWSL 1470/98.7 - Spanish Adult Hits

Kansas

Wichita
KRBB 97.9 - Adult Contemporary
KTHR 107.3 - Alternative
KZCH 96.3 - Top 40
KZSN 102.1 - Country

Kentucky

Lexington
WBUL-FM 98.1 - Country
WBUL-FM HD-2 98.5 - Classic Country
WKQQ 100.1 - Classic Rock
WLAP 630 - News/Talk
WLKT 104.5 - Top 40/CHR
WLKT HD-2 103.9 - Urban Contemporary
WMXL 94.5 - Adult Contemporary
WWTF 1580/97.7 - Alternative Rock

Louisville
WAMZ 97.5 - Country
WHAS 840 - News/Talk
WKJK 1080 - News/Talk
WKRD 790 - Sports talk
WNRW 98.9 - Top 40
WQMF 95.7 - Mainstream rock
WQMF-HD2 95.7 - Active Rock
WSDF 100.5 - Variety Hits
WTFX-FM 93.1 - Urban

Somerset
WJQQ 97.1 - Classic Rock
WLLK-FM 102.3 - Top 40/CHR
WSEK 910 - Classic Country
WSEK-FM 93.9 - Country
WSFC 1240 - News/Talk

Louisiana

Baton Rouge
KRVE 96.1 FM - Adult contemporary
WFMF 102.5 FM - Contemporary hit radio
WJBO 1150 AM/98.7 - News/Talk
WYNK-FM 101.5 - Country
WYNK-FM HD-2 97.7 - Oldies

New Orleans
KVDU 104.1 FM - Adult Hits
WNOE-FM 101.1 FM - Country
WODT 1280/96.7 - African-American oriented all-news (Black Information Network)
WQUE-FM 93.3 FM - Mainstream urban
WRNO-FM 99.5 FM - News/Talk
WRNO-FM HD-2 96.3 - Classic Hip-Hop
WYLD 940 AM - Urban gospel
WYLD-FM 98.5 FM - Urban adult contemporary

Maryland

Baltimore
WCAO 600 - Gospel
WPOC 93.1 - Country
WQLL 1370/99.9 - African-American oriented all-news (Black Information Network) (owned by M-10 Broadcasting)
WQSR 102.7 - Adult Hits
WZFT 104.3 - Top 40

Salisbury
WJDY 1470 - News/Talk
WKZP 95.9 - Top 40
WQHQ 104.7 - Adult Contemporary 
WSBY-FM 98.9 - R&B
WTGM 960 - Sports
WWFG 99.9 - Country

Massachusetts

Boston
WBWL 101.7 - Country
WBZ 1030 - All-news
WJMN 94.5 - Rhythmic CHR
WRKO 680 - News/Talk
WXKS 1200 - Conservative Talk
WXKS-FM 107.9 - CHR
WZLX 100.7 - Classic Rock
WZRM 97.7 - Spanish CHR

Cape Cod
WCIB 101.9 - Classic Hits
WCOD-FM 106.1 - Hot AC
WEII 96.3 - Sports
WXTK 95.1 - News/Talk

Springfield
WHYN 560/98.9 - News/Talk
WHYN-FM 93.1 - Hot Adult Contemporary
WRNX 100.9 - Country

Worcester
WSRS 96.1 Adult Contemporary
WTAG 580/94.9 News/Talk

Michigan

Detroit
WDFN 1130 - African-American oriented all-news (Black Information Network) 
WJLB 97.9 - Hip-Hop/R&B
WKQI 95.5 - Top 40/CHR
WLLZ 106.7 - Classic rock
WLLZ-HD2 106.7 - Rhythmic Top 40
WLLZ-HD3 106.7 - Oldies
WMXD 92.3 - Urban AC 
WNIC 100.3 - Adult contemporary

Grand Rapids
WBCT 93.7 - Country 
WBFX 101.3 - Oldies
WMAX-FM 96.1 - Sports
WMRR 101.7 - Classic rock 
WOOD 1300 - News/Talk 
WOOD-FM 106.9 - News/Talk
WSNX-FM 104.5 - Top 40/CHR
WSRW-FM 105.7 - Adult contemporary
WTKG 1230 - Talk/Sports

Muskegon
WKBZ 1090 - News/Talk 
WMUS 107.9 - Country

Minnesota

Twin Cities
KDWB-FM 101.3 - CHR
KEEY-FM 102.1 - Country
KFXN-FM 100.3 - Sports
KQQL 107.9 - Classic hits
KQQL HD-2 93.3 - African-American oriented all-news (Black Information Network)
KQQL HD-3 96.7 - Sports
KTCZ-FM 97.1 - Hot Adult Contemporary/Alternative Rock
KTCZ-FM HD-3 102.5 - Urban Contemporary
KTLK 1130/103.5 - News/talk

Rochester
KFAN 1270/93.5 - Sports
KMFX-FM 102.5/95.1 - Country
KRCH 101.7 - Classic rock

Mississippi

Biloxi
WBUV 104.9 - News/Talk
WKNN-FM 99.1 - Country
WMJY 93.7 - Adult contemporary
WQYZ 92.5 - Classic rock

Jackson
WHLH 95.5 - Gospel
WJDX 620 - News/Talk/Sports
WJDX-FM 105.1 - Hip Hop
WMSI-FM 102.9 - Country
WSFZ 930/98.1 - African-American oriented all-news (Black Information Network)
WSTZ-FM 106.7 - Classic rock

Laurel
WFFX 103.7 - Mainstream rock
WJKX 102.5 - Urban adult contemporary
WNSL 100.3 - Contemporary hit radio
WZLD 106.3 - Urban contemporary

Tupelo
WESE 92.5 - Hip Hop
WKMQ 1060/101.1 - News/Talk
WTUP 1490/107.7 - African-American oriented all-news (Black Information Network)
WTUP-FM 99.3 - Classic Hits
WWKZ 103.9 - Contemporary hit radio
WWZD-FM 106.7 - Country

Missouri

Springfield
KGBX-FM 105.9 - Adult Contemporary
KGMY 1400 - Sports
KSWF 100.5 - Country
KTOZ-FM 95.5 - Adult Top 40
KXUS 97.3 - Mainstream Rock

Saint Louis
KATZ 1600/93.3 - Gospel music
KATZ-FM 100.3 - Urban music
KATZ-FM HD-2 103.7 - African-American oriented all-news (Black Information Network)
KLOU 103.3 - Classic Hits
KSD 93.7 - Country music
KSLZ 107.7 - Top 40/CHR
KSLZ-HD2 107.7 - LBGTQ+ (Pride Radio)
KTLK-FM 104.9 - Conservative Talk

Nebraska

Ogallala
KMCX-FM 106.5 - Country
KOGA 930 - Classic Country
KOGA-FM 99.7 - Classic Hits

Omaha
KFAB 1110 - News/Talk
KFFF 93.3 - Classic Country
KFFF HD-2 102.3 - Regional Mexican
KGOR 99.9 - Classic Hits
KISO 96.1 - Top 40/CHR
KISO HD-2 94.9 - Active Rock
KXKT 103.7 - Country

Nevada

Las Vegas
KSNE-FM 106.5/93.7 - Mainstream AC
KWNR 95.5/92.7 - Country
KYMT 93.1 - Adult Hits
KYMT HD-2 103.9 - Urban Contemporary

New Hampshire

Manchester
WGIR 610 - Talk
WGIR-FM 101.1 - Mainstream Rock

Portsmouth
WERZ 107.1 - CHR
WHEB 100.3 - Mainstream Rock
WPKX 930 - Sports
WQSO 96.7 - Talk
WTBU 95.3 - Country
WTBU-HD2 95.3 - Classic Country

New Jersey

Sussex
WHCY 106.3 - Country
WNNJ 103.7 - Classic rock
WSUS 102.3 - Adult contemporary

New Mexico

Albuquerque
KABQ 1350 - Sports
KABQ-FM 95.1 - Rhythmic oldies
KBQI 107.9 - Country
KBQI HD-2 98.1 - Classic Country
KPEK 100.3 - Hot adult contemporary
KTEG 104.1 - Alternative rock
KZRR 94.1 - Mainstream rock
KZRR HD-2 100.9 - Urban Contemporary

Farmington
KCQL 1340/93.9 - Sports
KDAG 96.9 - Mainstream rock
KKFG 104.5 - Classic hits
KOLZ 102.9/107.7 - Contemporary hit radio
KTRA-FM 102.1 - Country

Gallup
KFMQ 106.1 - Mainstream rock
KFXR-FM 107.3 - Country
KGLX 99.1 - Country
KXTC 99.9 - Contemporary hit radio

New York

Albany
WGY 810 - News/Talk
WGY-FM 103.1 - News/Talk
WKKF 102.3 - Contemporary hit radio
WOFX 980/95.9 - Sports
WPYX 106.5 - Classic rock
WRVE 99.5 - Hot adult contemporary
WRVE HD-2 99.9 - Country
WTRY-FM 98.3 - Oldies

Binghamton
WBBI 107.5 - Country
WBNW-FM 105.7 - Contemporary hit radio
WENE 1430 - Sports
WINR 680/96.9 - Classic Country
WKGB-FM 92.5 - Mainstream rock
WMXW 103.3 - Adult contemporary

New York
WAXQ 104.3 - Classic rock
WHTZ 100.3 - CHR/Top 40
WKTU 103.5 - Rhythmic adult contemporary
WLTW 106.7 - Adult contemporary
WOR 710 - News/Talk
WWPR-FM 105.1 - Urban contemporary
WWRL 1600 - African-American oriented all-news (Black Information Network)

Poughkeepsie
WBWZ 93.3 - Mainstream Rock
WCTW 98.5 - Hot adult contemporary
WHUC 1230/106.9 - Country
WJIP 1370 - News/Talk
WKIP 1450/98.5 - News/Talk
WPKF 96.1 - Contemporary hit radio
WRNQ 92.1 - Adult contemporary
WRWB-FM 99.3 - Country
WRWD-FM 107.3 - Country
WZCR 93.5 - Oldies

Rochester
WAIO 95.1 - Hot talk/Classic rock
WDVI 100.5 - Country
WHAM 1180/96.1 - News/Talk
WHTK 1280 - Sports
WKGS 106.7 - Contemporary hit radio
WNBL 107.3 - 80's hits
WVOR 102.3 - Soft adult contemporary

Syracuse
WBBS 104.7 - Country
WHEN 620/101.7 - Urban adult contemporary
WSYR 570 - News/Talk
WSYR-FM 106.9 - News/Talk
WWHT 107.9 - Contemporary hit radio
WYYY 94.5 - Adult contemporary

North Carolina

Asheville
WKSF 99.9 - Country
WKSF HD-2 97.7 - Adult Hits
WKSF HD-3 101.1 - Alternative Rock
WMXF 1400 - Sports
WPEK 880/92.9 - Sports
WQNQ 104.3 - Contemporary hit radio
WQNS 105.1 - Mainstream rock
WWNC 570 - News/Talk

Charlotte
WEND 106.5 - Alternative Rock
WHQC 96.1 - Contemporary hit radio
WKKT 96.9 - Country
WLKO 102.9 - Adult hits
WRFX 99.7 - Classic rock
WRFX HD-2 98.7 - African-American oriented all-news (Black Information Network)

Greensboro-Winston-Salem-High Point
WMAG 99.5 - Adult Contemporary
WMKS 100.3 - Contemporary hit radio
WPTI 94.5 - News/Talk
WTQR 104.1 - Country
WVBZ 105.7 - Mainstream rock

Raleigh
WDCG 105.1 - Contemporary hit radio
WDCG HD-2 95.3 - Classic hip hop
WNCB 93.9 - Country
WRDU 100.7 - Classic rock
WTKK 106.1 - Talk

North Dakota

Bismarck
KBMR 1130/104.1 - Classic country
KFYR 550/99.7 - News/Talk
KQDY 94.5 - Country
KSSS 101.5 - Mainstream rock
KXMR 710 - Sports
KYYY 92.9 - Adult contemporary

Dickinson
KCAD 99.1 - Country
KLTC 1460 - Classic country
KZRX 92.1 - Mainstream rock

Grand Forks
KJKJ 107.5 - Mainstream rock
KKXL 1440 - Sports
KKXL-FM 92.9 - Top 40
KQHT 96.1 - Classic hits
KSNR 100.3 - Country

Minot
KCJB 910 - Classic country
KIZZ 93.7 - Top 40
KMXA-FM 99.9 - AC
KRRZ 1390 - Classic Hits
KYYX 97.1 - Country
KZPR 105.3 - Mainstream rock

Ohio 
(*) - Though Akron and Canton are officially separate radio markets, iHeart operates them as a single "Akron/Canton" cluster.

Akron*
WHLO 640 - News/Talk
WKDD 98.1 - Hot AC/Contemporary hits

Canton*
WHOF 101.7 - Classic hits
WHOF HD-2/99.7 - Country
WRKF-FM 106.9 - Mainstream rock

Chillicothe
WBEX 1490/92.7 - News/Talk
WCHI 1350 - Soft AC
WCHO 1250 - Oldies
WCHO-FM 105.5 - Country
WKKJ 94.3 - Country
WQLX 106.5 - Hot Adult Contemporary
WSRW 1590/101.5 - Classic hits

Cincinnati
WCKY 1530 - Sports
WEBN 102.7 - Active Rock
WEBN HD-2/100.7/106.3 - Alternative rock
WEBN HD-3/102.3 - Mainstream urban
WKFS 107.1 - Top 40
WKRC 550 - News/Talk
WLW 700/94.5 - News/Talk 
WSAI 1360 - Sports

Cleveland
WAKS 96.5 - Contemporary hits 
WAKS HD-2/106.1 - Urban contemporary
WARF 1350 - Sports
WGAR-FM 99.5 - Country
WHLK 106.5 - Adult hits
WMJI 105.7 - Classic hits
WMMS 100.7 - Active rock/hot talk
WMMS HD-2/99.1 - Black Information Network
WTAM 1100/106.9 - News/talk

Columbus
WCOL-FM 92.3 - Country
WNCI 97.9 - Contemporary Hits
WODC 93.3 - Adult Hits
WTVN 610 - News/Talk
WXZX 105.7 - Alternative Rock
WYTS 1230 - Black Information Network
WZCB 106.7 - Mainstream Urban
WZCB HD-2/105.3 - Classic Hip-Hop

Dayton
WCHD 99.9 - CHR/Top 40
WIZE 1340 - Black Information Network
WMMX 107.7 - Hot AC
WONE 980 - Sports
WTUE 104.7 - Classic Rock
WZDA 103.9 - Country

Defiance
WDFM 98.1 - Hot AC
WNDH 103.1 - Classic Hits
WONW 1280 - News/Talk
WZOM 105.7 - Country

Lima
WBKS 93.9 - Contemporary hit radio
WIMA 1150 - News/Talk
WIMT 102.1 - Country
WMLX 103.3 - Adult contemporary
WZRX-FM 107.5 - Oldies

Mansfield
WFXN-FM 102.3 - Classic rock
WMAN 1400 - News/Talk
WMAN-FM 98.3 - News/Talk (Simulcast of WMAN)
WNCO 1340 - Sports
WNCO-FM 101.3 - Country
WSWR 100.1 - Classic hits
WXXF 107.7 - Soft AC
WYHT 105.3 - Hot AC

Marion
WMRN 1490 - News/Talk
WMRN-FM 94.3 - Country
WYNT 95.9 - Hot Adult Contemporary

Toledo
WCKY-FM 103.7 - Classic Country
WCWA 1230 - Sports 
WIOT 104.7 - Mainstream Rock
WRVF 101.5 - Adult contemporary
WSPD 1370/92.9 - News/Talk
WVKS 92.5 - Contemporary hits 
WVKS HD-2/94.9 - Urban contemporary

Youngstown
WAKZ 95.9 - Hip Hop
WBBG 106.1 - Country
WKBN 570 - News/Talk
WMXY 98.9 - Adult contemporary
WNCD 93.3 - Mainstream rock
WNIO 1390 - Sports

Oklahoma

Oklahoma City
KGHM 1340 - Sports
KJYO 102.7 - Top 40
KREF-FM 94.7 - Sports
KREF-FM HD-2 98.5 - Regional Mexican
KTOK 1000 - News/Talk
KTST 101.9 - Country
KXXY-FM 96.1 - Classic country

Tulsa
KAKC 1300 - Conservative talk
KIZS 101.5 - Regional Mexican
KMOD-FM 97.5 - Mainstream Rock
KTBT 92.1 - Top 40
KTBZ 1430 - Sports
KTGX 106.1 - Country
KTGX HD-2 93.5 - Classic Rock

Oregon

Portland
KEX 1190 - Talk
KFBW 105.9 - Rock
KKCW 103.3 - AC
KKRZ 100.3 - CHR
KKRZ HD-2 102.3 - Alternative Rock
KLTH 106.7 - Classic Hits
KPOJ 620 - Sports
KXJM 107.5 - Classic Hip Hop

Pennsylvania

Allentown
WAEB 790 - News/Talk
WAEB-FM 104.1 - CHR/Top 40
WSAN 1470 - Oldies
WZZO 95.1 - Classic rock

Erie
WEBG 95.9 - Sports (WFNN simulcast)
WFNN 1330 - Sports
WJET 1400/96.7 - News/Talk
WRKT 104.9 - Active Rock
WRTS 103.7 - CHR/Top 40
WTWF 93.9 - Country
WXBB 94.7 - Adult Hits

Harrisburg
WHKF 99.3 - Urban contemporary
WHP 580/103.7 - News/Talk
WRBT 94.9 - Country
WRVV 97.3 - Classic Rock
WTKT 1460 - Sports

Lancaster
WLAN 1390/100.5 - Spanish
WLAN-FM 96.9 - CHR/Top 40

Philadelphia
WDAS 1480/102.5 - Sports
WDAS-FM 105.3 - Urban AC
WIOQ 102.1 - CHR/Top 40
WIOQ-HD2 102.1 - LGBTQ+ (Pride Radio)
WRFF 104.5 - Modern rock/Alternative
WTEL 610 - African-American oriented all-news (Black Information Network) (owned by Beasley Broadcast Group)
WUMR 106.1 - Spanish CHR
WUMR-HD2 106.1 - Smooth Jazz
WUSL 98.9 - Mainstream urban

Pittsburgh
WBGG 970 - Sports
WDVE 102.5 - Classic Rock
WJAS 1320/99.1 - News/Talk (Owned by St. Barnabas Broadcasting, partially programmed under master service agreement)
WKST-FM 96.1 - Top 40/CHR
WPGB 104.7 - Country
WWSW-FM 94.5 - Classic Hits
WWSW-FM-HD2 94.5 - Oldies
WXDX-FM 105.9 - Alternative

Reading
WRAW 1340 - Talk
WRFY-FM 102.5 - Adult Contemporary
WRFY-FM HD-2 92.3 - Spanish

Williamsport
WBYL 95.5 - Country
WKSB 102.7 - Hot AC
WRAK 1400 - News/Talk
WRKK 1200/94.9 - Rock
WVRT 97.7 - CHR/Top 40

Rhode Island

Providence
WHJJ 920/104.7 - News/Talk
WHJY 94.1 - Mainstream rock
WSNE-FM 93.3 - Hot adult contemporary
WWBB 101.5 - Classic hits

South Carolina

Charleston
WEZL 103.5 - Country
WRFQ 104.5 - Classic rock
WSCC-FM 94.3 - News/Talk
WXLY 102.5 - Adult contemporary

Columbia
WCOS 1400 - Sports
WCOS-FM 97.5 - Country
WLTY 96.7 Variety
WNOK 104.7 - CHR
WVOC 560/103.5 - News/Talk
WXBT 100.1 - Urban contemporary
WXBT HD-2 105.5 - African-American oriented all-news (Black Information Network)

Florence
WDAR-FM 105.5 - Urban contemporary
WDSC 800 - Sports
WEGX 92.9 - Country
WJMX 1400/104.5/105.9 - News/Talk
WJMX-FM 103.3 - CHR
WRZE 94.1 - Classic rock
WWRK 970/97.9 - Classic rock
WZTF 102.9/95.1 - Urban adult contemporary

Greenville
WESC 660 - Classic country (simulcast of WESC-FM)
WESC-FM 92.5 - Classic country
WGVL 1440 - African-American oriented all-news (Black Information Network)
WMYI 102.5 - Variety Hits
WROO 104.9 - Sports
WSSL-FM 100.5 - Country

Myrtle Beach
WGTR 107.9 - Country
WLQB 93.5 - Regional Mexican
WRXZ 107.1 - Mainstream rock
WWXM 97.7 - CHR
WYNA 104.9 - Variety

Tennessee

Memphis
KJMS 101.1 - Urban AC
KWNW 101.9 - Top 40
WDIA 1070 - Oldies
WEGR 102.7 - Classic rock
WHAL-FM 95.7 - Urban Gospel
WHRK 97.1 - Hip-Hop
WREC 600/92.1 - Talk

Nashville
WLAC 1510/98.3 - News/Talk
WNRQ 105.9 - Classic rock
WNRQ HD-2 97.5 - African-American oriented all-news (Black Information Network)
WRVW 107.5 - Top 40/CHR
WSIX-FM 97.9 - Country
WSIX-FM HD-3 97.9 - Classic country
WUBT 101.1 - Hip-Hop

Texas

Austin
KASE-FM 100.7 - Country music
KASE-FM HD-2 97.5 - Alternative rock
KHFI-FM 96.7 - Top 40
KPEZ 102.3 - Rhythmic contemporary
KPEZ-HD2 102.3 - LGBTQ+ (Pride Radio)
KVET 1300 - Sports radio
KVET-FM 98.1 - Country music
KVET-FM HD2 103.1 - 80's Music

Beaumont
KCOL-FM 92.5 - Classic Hits
KIOC 106.1 - Active rock
KKMY 104.5 - Rhythmic contemporary
KKMY HD-2 103.3 - Urban contemporary
KLVI 560 - News Talk radio
KYKR 95.1 - Country music

Bryan
KAGG 96.1 - Country music
KKYS 104.7 - Hot AC
KNFX-FM 99.5 - Classic rock
KVJM 103.1 - Top 40

Corpus Christi
KKTX 1360 - News Talk radio
KMXR 93.9 - Classic Hits
KNCN 101.3 - Active rock
KRYS-FM 99.1 - Country music
KSAB 99.9 - Tejano music
KUNO 1400 - Spanish music

Dallas
KDGE 102.1 - Mainstream AC
KDMX 102.9 - Hot AC
KEGL 97.1 - Sports/Hot Talk
KEGL-HD2 97.1 - Mainstream/Alternative Rock
KFXR 1190 - Talk radio
KHKS 106.1 - Top 40/CHR
KHKS-HD2 106.1 - LBGTQ+ (Pride Radio)
KHVN 970/95.3 - African-American oriented all-news (Black Information Network)
KKGM 1630 - African-American oriented all-news (Black Information Network)
KZPS 92.5 - Classic rock

El Paso
KHEY 1380 - Sports Radio
KHEY-FM 96.3 - Country music
KPRR 102.1 - Rhythmic contemporary
KPRR HD-2 93.5 - Rhythmic oldies/Classic hip-hop
KTSM 690 - News Talk radio
KTSM-FM 99.9 - Mainstream AC

Houston 
KBME 790 - Sports radio
KODA 99.1 - Adult contemporary music
KPRC 950 - Talk radio
KQBT 93.7 - Urban music
KTBZ-FM 94.5 - Alternative rock
KTRH 740 - News Talk radio
KXYZ 1320 - African-American oriented all-news (Black Information Network)

McAllen
KBFM 104.1 - Rhythmic Top 40
KHKZ 106.3 - Hot AC
KQXX-FM 105.5 - Hot AC (simulcast of KHKZ)
KTEX 100.3 - Country music
KVNS 1700 - Sports

San Antonio
KAJA 97.3 - Country music
KQXT-FM 101.9 - AC
KQXT-FM-HD2 101.9 - Smooth jazz
KQXT-FM HD-3 105.7 - Regional Mexican
KRPT 92.5/93.3 - Classic country
KTKR 760 - Sports radio
KXXM 96.1 - Top 40 Mainstream
KZEP-FM 104.5 - Spanish CHR
WOAI 1200 AM - News Talk radio (first "Clear Channel" owned station, merged with KAJA FM under San Antonio Broadcasting umbrella)

Waco
KBGO 95.7 FM - Classic Hits
KBGO HD-2 95.1 - Rhythmic Contemporary
KBRQ 102.5 FM - Active rock
KIIZ-FM 92.3 - Urban music
KLFX 107.3 FM - Active rock
KWTX 1230 AM - News/Talk
KWTX-FM 97.5 - Top 40 Mainstream
WACO-FM 99.9 - Country music

Utah

Salt Lake City
KAAZ-FM 106.7 - Mainstream Rock 
KJMY 99.5 - Hot AC
KJMY HD-2 99.1 - Business News
KNRS 570 - Talk
KNRS-FM 105.9 - Talk
KODJ 94.1 - Classic Hits
KZHT 97.1 - Top 40

Virginia

Harrisonburg
WACL 98.5 - Rock
WAZR 93.7 - Top 40/CHR
WKCY 1300/107.9 - Talk
WKCY-FM 104.3 - Country
WKDW 900 - Classic Country
WSVO 93.1 - Adult Contemporary

Norfolk
WHBT-FM 92.1 - Classic Hip Hop
WMOV-FM 107.7 - Rhythmic Adult Contemporary 
WNOH 105.3 - African-American oriented all-news (Black Information Network)
WOWI 102.9  - Urban

Roanoke
WJJS 93.5 - Rhythmic Contemporary
WJJX 102.7 - Rhythmic Contemporary
WROV-FM 96.3 - Classic Rock
WROV-FM HD-2 96.7 - African-American oriented all-news (Black Information Network)
WSTV 104.9 - Adult Hits
WSTV HD-2 96.9 - Alternative Rock
WYYD 107.9 - Country

Winchester
WFQX 99.3 - Classic rock
WKSI-FM 98.3 - Top 40/CHR
WKSI-FM HD-2 95.7 - Classic Country
WMRE 1550 - Sports
WUSQ-FM 102.5 - Country

Washington

Seattle
KBKS-FM 106.1 - Top 40/CHR
KHHO 850 - African-American oriented all-news (Black Information Network)
KJAQ 96.5 - Adult Hits
KJAQ-HD2 96.5 - Alternative Rock
KJEB 95.7 - Classic Hits
KJR 950 - Sports
KJR-FM 93.3 - Sports (KJR simulcast)
KJR-FM-HD2 93.3 - Hip Hop
KPTR 1090 - Conservative Talk
KZOK-FM 102.5 - Classic Rock

Spokane
KCDA 103.1 - Hot AC
KFOO-FM 96.1 - Alternative Rock
KISC 98.1 - Adult Contemporary
KISC HD-2 99.3 - Country
KKZX 98.9 - Classic Rock
KQNT 590 - News/Talk
KZFS 1280/101.5 - Classic Hip Hop

West Virginia

Huntington
WAMX 106.3 - Classic rock
WBVB 97.1 - Classic hits
WKEE-FM 100.5 - Contemporary hit radio
WTCR-FM 103.3 - Country
WVHU 800 - News/Talk
WZWB 1420 - Sports

Parkersburg
WDMX 100.1 - Classic Hits
WLTP 910 - News/Talk
WNUS 107.1 - Country
WRVB 102.1 - Contemporary hit radio

Wheeling
WBBD 1400/103.9 - Sports
WEGW 107.5 - Active rock
WKWK-FM 97.3 - Adult contemporary
WOVK 98.7 - Country
WVKF 95.7 - Contemporary hit radio
WWVA 1170 - News/Talk

Wisconsin

Eau Claire
WATQ 106.7 - Classic country
WBIZ 1400/98.7 - Sports
WBIZ-FM 100.7 - Contemporary hit radio
WMEQ 880/106.3 - News/Talk
WMEQ-FM 92.1 - Classic rock
WQRB 95.1 - Country

Madison
WIBA 1310 - News/Talk
WIBA-FM 101.5 - Classic rock
WIBA-FM HD-2 100.9 - Oldies
WMAD 96.3 - Country
WTSO 1070 - Sports
WXXM 92.1 - Classic Hits
WZEE 104.1 - CHR

Milwaukee
WISN 1130 - News/Talk
WKKV-FM 100.7 - Urban contemporary
WMIL-FM 106.1 - Country
WOKY 920 - Sports
WRIT-FM 95.7 - Classic Hits
WRNW 97.3 - Sports

Wyoming

Cheyenne
KOLT-FM 100.7 - Country
KOLT-FM HD-2 97.1 - Adult Contemporary

Notes

References